Saul Eslake is an Australian economist, commentator, and public speaker. He is the principal of Corinna Economic Advisory, and previously was the Chief Economist at the Australia & New Zealand Banking Group between 1995 and 2009, and the Chief Economist for Bank of America Merrill Lynch (Australia and New Zealand) between 2011 and 2015. He has been a Vice Chancellor's Fellow at the University of Tasmania since 2016.

Early life and education
Eslake was born in England and adopted by Australian parents. After moving to Tasmania at age 8 with his family, Eslake attended school in Smithton and Hobart. Eslake completed a first class honours degree in Economics from the University of Tasmania and a Post Graduate Diploma in Applied Finance and Investment from the Securities Institute of Australia (now known as FINSIA). He has completed the Senior Executive Program at the Columbia University Graduate School of Business, and (with Merit) the Company Directors’ Course of the Australian Institute of Company Directors.

Career
Eslake began his career as an economist  in Fiscal and Monetary Policy sections of the Australian Treasury, in Canberra. Eslake then worked for the Advisory Council for Inter-Government Relations (specializing in federal-state financial relations and in housing policy) and for the Opposition (Minority) Leader in the State Parliament of Victoria. Eslake then worked as chief economist in the financial markets for 25 years, including as the Chief Economist at McIntosh Securities in the late 1980s, the Chief Economist (International) for the investment management division of National Mutual in the early 1990s, the Chief Economist at the Australia & New Zealand Banking Group between 1995 and 2009, and the Chief Economist (Australia and New Zealand) for Bank of America Merrill Lynch between 2011 and 2015.

He has been the Australian representative on the International Conference of Commercial Bank Economists (ICCBE) since 2003, and chaired its Steering Committee between 2018 and 2021.

Eslake has been a Vice Chancellor's Fellow of the University of Tasmania since April 2016. 

Eslake is the principal of Corinna Economic Advisory, his own economics consulting business based in Hobart. His clients and subscribers include investors, corporations, organizations, associations, and government agencies. In 2021 Corinna Economic Advisory joined with a similar London-based economics consultancy, Llewellyn Consulting, to form Independent Economics, to offer similar services to clients around the world.

Eslake is a member of the Australian Parliamentary Budget Office's panel of expert advisors, and a member of Australian Taxation Office’s ‘Tax Gap’ expert advisory panel; and a non-executive director of the Macquarie Point Development Corporation, which is managing the re-development of a 14-ha parcel of land adjoining Hobart's waterfront. He has previously served on a variety of government advisory councils. Eslake has also previously been Chair of the Tasmanian Arts Advisory Board, which advised on the distribution of grants to arts companies and individual artists. He has also been a non-executive director of the Gas and Fuel Corporation of Victoria; the Australian Housing and Urban Research Institute, Hydro Tasmania and Housing Choices Australia.

Economic analysis and reports
Eslake's economic analysis and economic reports have covered broad macro-economic themes including economic and employment growth, inflation, international trade, commodity prices, bond and currency markets, labour markets, productivity, climate change, household and corporate debt, public finance, fiscal and monetary policy, inter-government financial relations, taxation, climate change, and regulatory issues. He has also undertaken and published research on specific industries or themes including housing, tourism, agriculture, energy, infrastructure investment, metals and minerals, poverty alleviation, income distribution and inequality, taxation reform, shipping and transport, the future of work, and regional development.

Eslake has written reports commissioned by private and public organisations as well as government institutions on topics such as  sovereign risk, housing affordability and home ownership, taxation reform, shipping costs, international student education, the Tasmanian economy, productivity, the labour market, and various aspects of macro-economic policy. Eslake has also made submissions to or given evidence before Parliamentary committees, on topics such as central bank independence, housing affordability and housing policy, infrastructure spending, fiscal policy, Australia's response to COVID-19, the conduct of monetary policy and the measurement of unemployment.

Since late April 2020, Eslake produced a weekly Coronavirus Impact Chart Pack about the impact of the COVID-19 pandemic and government responses on the Australian economy, world economy, and on major individual economies such as the US, China, Japan, other Asian economies, Europe and New Zealand. It has been referred to by the Parliament of Australia, by the media including Alan Kohler, Adam Creighton and Ross Gittins. In 2022, the Coronavirus Impact Chart Pack was replaced by two separate publications The World Economy this Week chart pack, about developments in the global economy and in the economies of major nations and regions, and The Australian Economy this Week chart pack, about developments in the Australian economy.

Public speaker
Eslake is a travelling speaker at public and private conferences. He has also appeared as a guest on Conversations with Richard Fidler on ABC. He participates in panel discussions; presents to boards, investment and asset allocation committees; undertakes customized analyses and reports for corporate, investor, not-for-profit and government clients; has given testimony to Parliamentary Committees; and appears frequently on radio and TV and in the print media in Australia and other countries. In 2021, he was described as "a favourite among economics journalists, known for his long memory and ability to deliver an opinion on almost any topic" by Jessica Irvine, writing for The Sydney Morning Herald.

Through his monthly webinars, Eslake shares his view on topics such as Assessments of Australian federal budget, Australian New Protectionism, quantitative easing, Modern Monetary fiscal policy and government debt.

Print and online media
Over the years Eslake has contributed writing to various Australian and international print and online media. ‘The best way to push bad policy is to wrap it up in a ‘security’ blanket’, originally published in The Age and the Sydney Morning Herald, 9 November 2011 was featured in The Best Australian Business Writing 2012.

Honours and awards
 2002 University of Tasmania Foundation Graduate Award
 2012 Honorary Doctor of Laws degree by the University of Tasmania
 His website was selected for preservation by the National Library of Australia's Trove in 2016

Personal life
Eslake and his wife have two children who are adopted. Eslake and his family moved to Tasmania in late 2014 and they live in Hobart.

References

External links

Australian economists
Living people
Year of birth missing (living people)
University of Tasmania alumni
Columbia Business School alumni